Mariló López Garrido (born April 5, 1963, in Madrid) is a Spanish journalist, radio presenter, spiritual therapist, music composer, writer and photographer.

Through her radio programme, La Voz de la Noche she focuses on popularization of topics such as self-help, personal growth, spirituality, natural health, and alternative medicine, as well as social awareness discussions about ecology, human rights, poverty and how to help developing countries and the most disadvantaged.

Founder and director of Arte y Locura publisher based on CDs and books related to personal development, meditations, relaxation and music. The publisher devotes 25% of its earnings to funding projects to support children in developing countries, projects which she oversees personally.

She also has produced her own personal development and self-awareness courses which she delivers in America, Spain and England.

References

External links 
Crecimiento Personal (official site).
La Voz de la Noche (La Voz de la Noche radio programme site).
Mariló in facebook (Facebook)

1963 births
Living people
People from Madrid
Spanish journalists
Argentine women journalists
Self-help writers
Spanish publishers (people)